The Royal Scientific Society (RSS) is an independent non-governmental, not-for-profit multidisciplinary science 
institution established by royal charter. Founded in 1970 as a national organisation to actively advise and support 
the development of Jordan with sound technical and policy advice, and consultations. The RSS undertakes specialised 
and accredited testing, research work with local industries and universities, consultations for the private and public 
sectors, and works in partnership with regional and international organisations. Since its inception as a national and 
independent organisation, the prime objectives of the RSS have been to protect human health and safety, to safeguard 
the environment, and to contribute to sustainable economic development.

Main Aims
To support the development process in Jordan through R&D to strengthen the role of SMEs in Jordan's economy. 
To promote itself as a reference technical institution in Jordan and the region.
To expand its role as a certification body for both skilled manpower and industrial products. 
To strengthen co-operation with similar institutions to promote mutual interests. 
To develop human resources. 
To encourage and support the start-up, incubation and development of innovation-led knowledge-based businesses.

Technical Centres
 Building Research Centre. 
 Electronic Services & Training Centre. 
 Environmental Research Centre. 
 Information Technology Centre. 
 Mechanical Design & Technology Centre. 
 Industrial Chemistry Centre. 
 Quality Assurance Department.
There are also three supporting departments: Administrative, Financial, and Marketing and Public Relations.

See also
 Ministry of Higher Education and Scientific Research (Jordan)
 University of Jordan
 Princess Sumaya University for Technology
 Jordan University of Science and Technology

External links
 Royal Scientific Society
 ِAl-Hassan Science City

Science and technology in Jordan
Non-profit organisations based in Jordan
Research institutes in Jordan
Organisations based in Jordan with royal patronage
1970 establishments in Jordan
Organizations established in 1970
Members of the International Council for Science
Members of the International Science Council